The Melbourne Observer newspaper is circulated across Victoria every week. It was established by transport magnate Gordon Barton in September 1969 as the "Sunday Observer", Melbourne's first Sunday newspaper. Barton ran the paper for 18 months, with a $1.5 million loss, going on to publish the Sunday Review, later known as The Review, then Nation Review.

Maxwell Newton started his version of the Melbourne Observer in March 1971, two weeks after Barton closed his enterprise. From August 1973, the newspaper was re-titled "Sunday Observer". About 1977, after financial pressures, Peter Isaacson purchased the Melbourne Observer for $425,000. He ran the weekly paper until June 1989.

The Melbourne Observer was resurrected in 2002 as a midweek publication by Victorian publisher Ash Long. It has achieved a weekly readership of more than 55,000. The content sources include original columnists and contributors as well as material aggregated from other influential media sources such as social media, newspapers and on line.

See also
 
 National Library of Australia Newspaper Histories

References

Newspapers published in Melbourne
Weekly newspapers published in Australia